The Hoholmen Bridge is a cantilever bridge in the municipality of Herøy in Nordland county, Norway. Together with the Åkviksundet Bridge, it forms the road connection between the island municipalities of Herøy and Dønna.

See also
List of bridges in Norway
List of bridges in Norway by length
List of bridges
List of bridges by length

References

Road bridges in Nordland
Herøy, Nordland